Okayama 2nd district was a multi-member constituency of the House of Representatives in the Imperial Diet of Japan. Between 1928 and 1942 it elected five representatives by single non-transferable vote (SNTV).

It covered the western parts of Okayama, namely the Kodama, Tsukubo, Asakuchi, Oda, Shitsuki, Kibi, Jōbō, Kawakami and Atetsu counties. The predominantly rural district was usually won by a majority of Seiyūkai candidates, among them Inukai Tsuyoshi who succeeded Tanaka Giichi as party president in 1929. His son Takeru was among two candidates who were elected without Taisei Yokusankai support in the wartime election of 1942.

Following the 1946 redistricting, the area became part of the limited voting Okayama At-large district.

Elected representatives 

Party affiliations as of election day; †: died in office.

References 

Politics of Okayama Prefecture
Districts of the House of Representatives (Japan)